There were seven special elections to the United States House of Representatives in 1961, during 87th United States Congress.

List of elections 

|-
| 
| William F. Norrell
|  | Democratic
| November 8, 1938
|  | Incumbent died February 15, 1961.New member elected April 18, 1961.Democratic hold.
| nowrap | 

|-
| 
| Stewart Udall
|  | Democratic
| November 2, 1954
|  | Incumbent resigned January 18, 1961, to become U.S Secretary of the Interior.New member elected May 2, 1961.Democratic hold.
| nowrap | 

|-
| 
| Walter M. Mumma
|  | Republican
| November 4, 1952
|  | Incumbent died February 25, 1961.New member elected May 16, 1961. Republican hold.
| nowrap | 

|-
| 
| B. Carroll Reece
|  | Republican
| November 7, 1950
|  | Incumbent died March 19, 1961.New member elected  May 16, 1961.Republican hold.
| nowrap | 

|-
| 
| Paul J. Kilday
|  | Democratic
| November 8, 1938
|  | Incumbent resigned September 24, 1961, to become judge of United States Court of Appeals for the Armed Forces.New member elected November 4, 1961.Democratic hold.
| nowrap | 

|-
| 
| Thaddeus M. Machrowicz
|  | Democratic
| November 7, 1950
|  | Incumbent resigned September 18, 1961, to become judge of the United States District Court for the Eastern District of Michigan.New member elected November 7, 1961.Democratic hold.
| nowrap | 

|-
| 
| Overton Brooks
|  | Democratic
| November 3, 1936
|  | Incumbent died September 16, 1961.New member elected December 19, 1961.Democratic hold.
| nowrap | 

|}

See also 
 List of special elections to the United States House of Representatives

 
1961